King Zhending of Zhou, personal name  Ji Jie, was the twenty-eighth king of the Chinese Zhou dynasty and the sixteenth of Eastern Zhou. He ruled between 468 BC and 441 BC.

Family
King Zhending had four sons:
 First son, Prince Quji (d. 441 BC), ruled as King Ai of Zhou in 441 BC
 Prince Shuxi (d. 441 BC), ruled as King Si of Zhou in 441 BC
 Prince Wei (d. 426 BC), ruled as King Kao of Zhou from 440–426 BC
 Prince Jie (d. 415 BC), ruled as Duke Huan of Western Zhou from 440–415 BC

Ancestry

See also
Family tree of ancient Chinese emperors

Sources 

441 BC deaths
Zhou dynasty kings
5th-century BC Chinese monarchs
Year of birth unknown